Corey David Littrell (born March 21, 1992) is an American former professional baseball pitcher.

Career
Littrell attended Trinity High School in Louisville, Kentucky, and pitched for the school's baseball team. He committed to attend the University of Kentucky to play college baseball for the Kentucky Wildcats. In 2012, as a sophomore, he posted a 9–2 record with a 2.74 ERA. That same year, he also won a Gold Glove Award as the best defensive pitcher in college baseball, as voted by the American Baseball Coaches Association. After the 2012 season, he played collegiate summer baseball with the Harwich Mariners of the Cape Cod Baseball League.

The Boston Red Sox selected Littrell in the fifth round of the 2013 Major League Baseball draft. Littrell signed with the Red Sox, and began his professional career with the Lowell Spinners of the Class A-Short Season New York–Penn League. He began the 2014 season with the Salem Red Sox of the Class A-Advanced Carolina League, and was traded to the St. Louis Cardinals with John Lackey for Allen Craig and Joe Kelly. The Cardinals assigned Littrell to the Palm Beach Cardinals of the Class A-Advanced Florida State League. He pitched for Palm Beach for the rest of the 2014 season, and for the 2015 season.

The Cardinals invited Littrell to spring training as a non-roster player in 2016. He began the 2016 season with the Springfield Cardinals of the Class AA Texas League, and was promoted to the Memphis Redbirds of the Class AAA Pacific Coast League in May. Littrell ended the 2016 season with a 2–4 record and 3.90 ERA. After the season, the Cardinals assigned Littrell to the Glendale Desert Dogs of the Arizona Fall League (AFL).

During spring training 2017, Littrell was suspended for 50 games following a second positive test for a drug of abuse, in violation of MLB’s Joint Drug Prevention and Treatment Program After serving his suspension, he returned to Springfield and spent the remainder of the season there, posting a 1–2 record with a 4.15 ERA in 28 games. On April 2, 2018, Littrell was released by the Cardinals organization.

Personal life
Littrell's grandfather Jack Littrell played 111 games in MLB during the 1950s as an infielder.

References

External links

1992 births
Living people
Baseball players from Louisville, Kentucky
Baseball pitchers
Kentucky Wildcats baseball players
Harwich Mariners players
Lowell Spinners players
Salem Red Sox players
Palm Beach Cardinals players
Trinity High School (Louisville) alumni
Springfield Cardinals players
Memphis Redbirds players
Minor league baseball players
American sportspeople in doping cases
Baseball players suspended for drug offenses